Serbia made its debut as independent country at the 2007 Winter Universiade while previously competed as part of SFR Yugoslavia (1961–1991) and FR Yugoslavia/Serbia and Montenegro (1993–2005). Serbia hosted 2009 Summer Universiade in Belgrade.

Medal count
Serbia has won 48 medals in four appearances at the Summer Universiade and is ranked 35th in all-time Summer Universiade medal table.

Medals by Summer Universiade

Medals by Winter Universiade

Medals by Summer sports

Medals by Winter sports

See also
Serbia at the Olympics
Serbia at the Paralympics
Serbia at the European Youth Olympic Festival

External links
FISU History at the FISU
University association of Serbia

 
Nations at the Universiade
Student sport in Serbia